Jane Snyder Richards (January 31, 1823 – November 17, 1912)  was a counselor to Zina D. H. Young in the general presidency of the Relief Society of the Church of Jesus Christ of Latter-day Saints (LDS Church) from 1888 to 1901.

Early life and family

Jane Snyder was born to Isaac Richards Snyder and his wife Lovisa Comstock in Parmelia, Jefferson County, New York.

By her early teens her family had moved to Addington County, Upper Canada. While there her parents and siblings joined The Church of Jesus Christ of Latter-day Saints. They were taught about the Church by John E. Page. Jane did not join until January 1840. Passing through a severe illness that had left her paralyzed and speechless, Jane only regained her speech after the prayers of her brother at the age of 17. Her baptism was performed by her brother Robert Snyder after cutting the ice at LaPorte, Indiana. The townspeople opposed her baptism because Richards awoke gravely ill the day before. She came up out of the water healed from her ailment rather than more sick from exposure. 

On December 18, 1842, she married Franklin D. Richards. They had six children, including Franklin S. Richards. The Richards came to Utah Territory in 1848 after much persecution and sickness in Nauvoo.

Church service
Richards was a member of the original Relief Society that was established in 1842 in Nauvoo, Illinois. She served on the General Board (called the Central Board until 1892) of the Relief Society from 1888 to 1910. She was a counselor to general president Zina D. H. Young from 1888 to 1901. Richards was the Relief Society delegate to the National Council of Women in 1891.

Richards also served as president of a local Relief Society in Weber County, Utah. When this Relief Society was formed, it was the first Relief Society to be created between the general organization and the most local ward-level organizations.

Richards's daughter, Josephine Richards West, served as a counselor in the general presidency of the Primary.

In memory 
To honor the memory of Jane S. Richards, members of the Weber Stake planted a green ash tree next to the former Relief Society Hall which was built as a result of the efforts of Mrs. Richards. A sketch of her life was written, concealed inside a bottle and placed at the root of the tree by Miss Virginia Richards Burton.

Notes

1823 births
1912 deaths
American leaders of the Church of Jesus Christ of Latter-day Saints
American suffragists
Converts to Mormonism
Counselors in the General Presidency of the Relief Society
Latter Day Saints from Illinois
Latter Day Saints from Indiana
Latter Day Saints from New York (state)
Latter Day Saints from Utah
Mormon pioneers
Richards–Young family
Harold B. Lee Library-related 19th century articles